The Bhiwandi Rural Assembly constituency is one of the 288 Vidhan Sabha (legislative assembly) constituencies of the Maharashtra state in western India. This constituency is located in the Thane district and Palghar district, and was created in 2008 delimitation exercise. Most of the area under it was earlier covered by the erstwhile Wada Assembly constituency. It is a segment of Bhiwandi (Lok Sabha constituency) .

Geographical scope
The constituency comprises parts of Bhiwandi taluka viz. revenue circles Dighashi, Angaon,
Padgha, Additional Bhiwandi, Kharbav, Padgha (CT), Kon (CT) parts of Wada taluka viz. revenue circles Wada.

Members of Vidhan Sabha

Election results

Assembly Elections 2009

Assembly Elections 2014

References

Assembly constituencies of Thane district
Bhiwandi
Assembly constituencies of Palghar district
Assembly constituencies of Maharashtra